U-9 may refer to one of the following German submarines:

 , was the lead ship of the Type U 9 class of submarines; launched in 1910 and served in the First World War until surrendered on 26 November 1918, and famous for the action of 22 September 1914
 During the First World War, Germany also had these submarines with similar names:
 , a Type UB I submarine launched in 1915 and stricken on 19 February 1919
 , a Type UC I submarine launched in 1915 and sunk 20 October 1915
 , a Type IIB submarine that served in the Second World War and sank on 20 August 1944
 , a Type 205 submarine of the Bundesmarine that was launched in 1967; decommissioned in 1993; now a museum ship in Speyer, see Technikmuseum Speyer.

U-9 or U-IX may also refer to:
 U-IX, an Austro-Hungarian Navy submarine

Submarines of Germany